Sri Varahaswamy Temple, also called Bhu Varahaswamy Temple, is a Hindu temple dedicated to the god Varaha, situated at hill town of Tirumala in Tirupati, located in Tirupati district of Andhra Pradesh state, India. The temple is situated on the northern premises of Venkateswara Temple, Tirumala, on north west corner of Swami Pushkarini. This temple is believed to be older than the Venkateswara Shrine.

Religious significance 

As per legend, after saving the Earth from the demon Hiranyaksha, Vishnu's boar avatar Varaha stayed on this hill on the northern bank of Swami Pushkarini. Hence Tirumala Hills is also referred to as Adi Varaha Kshetra. In the beginning of the present Yuga Kali Yuga, Varaha donated land to another form of Vishnu - Venkateswara on his request. As a gratitude, Venkateswara offered the right of first bell, puja and Naivedyam (food offering) to Varaha before they were offered to him. This is being followed as a tradition even today.

Devotees are prescribed to have darshan ("sight") of Varaha before Venkateswara. It is believed that the pilgrimage to Tirumala will not be complete without having darshan of Varaha.

History
The temple was renovated by Pedda Tirumalacharya in the year 1535 AD.

Administration
The temple is part of Tirumala Venkateswara Temple and is being administered by Tirumala Tirupati Devasthanams.

Architecture
The rock temple is situated in the Northern bank of Swami Pushkarini and is accessed from North Mada street of Venkateswara Temple.

Poojas and Festivals

Daily rituals are held as per Vaikanasa Agama. Chakrasnanam event during Annual brahmotsavams, Vaikunta Dwadasi, Rathasapthami will be held in the mukha mandapa of Varahswamy Temple. Varaha Jayanti is also celebrated.

See also
 Hindu Temples in Tirupati
 List of temples under Tirumala Tirupati Devasthanams

References 

Tirupati
Hindu temples in Tirupati district
Tirumala Tirupati Devasthanams
Varaha temples